Crenicichla tendybaguassu is a species of cichlid native to South America. It is found in the Uruguay River drainage, in tributaries of the middle and upper Uruguay River basin.

References

tendybaguassu
Freshwater fish of Brazil
Taxa named by Carlos Alberto Santos de Lucena
Taxa named by Sven O. Kullander
Fish described in 1992